The Hush!! Full Band Festival is a free entrance government-sponsored music festival focussing on local rock music with invited international guest bands.

History 

In 2005, the Hush!! Full Band Festival got established, a government-sponsored modern music festival featuring pop rock and hard rock bands from all over Asia with a focus on Macau bands. The festival is free of charge and it's in its 9th edition in 2013.

Band Lists

2013 

 Girugamesh
 Blademark
 Scamper
 Bomber
 WhyOceans
 Sugar Plum Ferry

References

External links 
 Official website

Rock festivals in China
Music festivals established in 2005
2005 establishments in China
Annual events in China